Angel is a given name meaning "angel", "messenger". In the English-speaking world Angel is used for both boys and girls.

From the medieval Latin masculine name Angelus, which was derived from the name of the heavenly creature (itself derived from the Greek word ἄγγελος (angelos) meaning "messenger"). It has never been very common in the English-speaking world, where it is sometimes used as a feminine name in modern times. In the United States, while it is more common among girls (although not as common as Angela), it has seen some increase among boys, in particular as an English pronunciation of Spanish Ángel.

Ángel is a common male name in Spanish-speaking countries.

Variations

Albanian: Engjëll, Ankelo, Anxhelo
Asturian: Ánxel, Ánxelu, Xelu (short)
Bulgarian: Ангел (Angel) (masc.), Ангелина (Angelina) (fem.)

French: Ange (masc.), Angèl (masc.), Angèle (fem.), Angélique (fem.)
Galician: Anxo
Gascon: Angé, Angeoul
Greek: Άγγελος, Ággelos Angelos (masc.); Αγγελική, Aggelikē Angelice, Αγγελίνα, Aggelina Angelina, Αγγελίτα, Aggelita Angelita Αγγέλα, Aggéla, Angela (fem.)
Hungarian: Angyal, Angyalka
Italian: Angelo, Angelino, Angela, Angelina, Angelica (fem.)
Languedocien dialect: Angel, Anxo
Macedonian: Ангел (Angel, masc,), Ангела (Angela, fem,), Ангелина (Angelina, fem.)
Polish: Aniol, Angela, Aniela, Angelika, Angelina
Portuguese: Ângelo, Ângela (fem.), Angelino, Angelina (fem.), Angélica (fem.)
Spanish: Ángel, Ángela (fem.), Angélica (fem.), Ángeles (fem.), Angelines (fem.), Angelita (fem.), Angelina (fem.)

People 
Angel
 Angel Aquino (born 1973), Filipina actress
 Angel Batista, fictional character from the TV series Dexter
 Angel Bermudez, Aruban politician
 Angel Coulby (born 1980), English actress
 Angel Faith (born 1988), American singer and songwriter
 Angel Gomes (born 2000), English footballer
 Angel Guardian (born 1998), Filipina actress and singer
 Angel Kelly, American pornographic actress
 Angel Locsin (born 1985), Filipina actress
 Angel McCoughtry (born 1986), American basketball player
 Angel Medina (wrestler) (born 1970), American professional wrestler
 Angel Medina (artist) (born 1964), American comic-book artist
 Angel Mendez (1946–1967), United States Marine
 Angel Reece (born 1983), American professional wrestler known as Hailey Hatred
 Angel Rubio (born 1975), American football player
 Angel Stoyanov (boxer) (born 1967), Bulgarian boxer
 Angel Stoyanov (ski jumper) (born 1958), Bulgarian Olympian skier
 Angel Wong, Hong Kong gymnast

Ángel
 Ángel Cabrera (born 1969), Argentine golfer
 Ángel D'Meza (1877–1954), Cuban baseball player
 Ángel Di María (born 1988), Argentine footballer
 Ángel Galarza (1892–1966), Spanish lawyer, journalist and politician
 Ángel Hernández (umpire) (born 1961), Cuban-born Major League Baseball umpire
 Ángel Hernández (athlete) (born 1966), Spanish long jumper
 Ángel López (born 1981), Spanish footballer
 Ángel López (rugby union) (born 1992), Spanish rugby sevens player
 Ángel Martínez (born 1986), Spanish footballer
 Ángel Matías (born 1976), Puerto Rican volleyball player
 Ángel Matos (born 1976), Cuban taekwondo athlete
 Ángel Muñoz García also known as Jordi El Niño Polla (born 1994), Spanish pornographic actor
 Ángel Pagán (born 1981), Puerto Rican baseball player
 Ángel Parra (born 1943), Chilean singer and songwriter
 Ángel Parra (judoka) (born 1983), Spanish judoka
 Ángel Pérez (disambiguation)
 Ángel Pérez (volleyball) (born 1982), Puerto Rican volleyball player
 Ángel Pérez (footballer) (born 1981), Spanish footballer

Anđeo
 Anđeo Lovrov Zadranin (fourteenth century), Croatian architect 
 Anđeo Zvizdović ( 1420 – 7 June 1498), Franciscan friar and evangelist in medieval Bosnia

References

Given names
Masculine given names
Feminine given names
Spanish masculine given names
English feminine given names